The Aston Martin DB4 GT Zagato is a grand tourer sports car designed by Zagato and produced between 1960 and 1963. Introduced in October 1960 at the London Motor Show, it was effectively a DB4 GT, lightened and improved by the Zagato factory in Italy, by Ercole Spada. Initially, the factory planned to produce 25 cars, but demand was not as strong as expected and production was reduced to 20.

The popularity of the original DB4 GT Zagato resulted in two subsequent waves of cars based on DB4s being rendered into "Zagatos" through the cooperation of Aston Martin and the Zagato works in Italy. They are known as "Sanction II" and "Sanction III" cars. Also, an unauthorised but lucrative private industry of modifying original DB4 GTs into "Zagato" replicas has arisen as well to meet market demand for high-quality Zagato recreations.

Specification

Engine 
Although the specification of the engine was changed and upgraded throughout their racing history, the Aston Martin DB4 GT Zagato predominantly featured a 3.7-litre aluminium twin-spark straight 6-cylinder engine with a 9.7:1 compression ratio, higher than the DB4 GT engine.

Body 
Ercole Spada at Zagato transformed the DB4 GT into a smaller, more aerodynamic, super-lightweight car. Many steel components were replaced with the more lightweight and heat-resistant aluminium components. All non-essential elements disappeared, such as the bumpers.

Racing history 
Four of the original Aston Martin DB4 GT Zagato's chassis, No.s 0191, 0193, 0182 (1 VEV) and 0183 (2 VEV), were built to a lightened DP207/209 specification especially for racing. The DP209 cars have a lower roofline, larger rear wings, a reshaped tail and a flatter, longer front end.

The first major race using an Aston Martin DB4 GT Zagato was around Easter in 1961 at Goodwood. Driven by Stirling Moss, the car finished 3rd, behind an Aston Martin DB4 GT and the winning Ferrari 250 GT.

The most prominent DB4 GT Zagatos, affectionately known by the registration plates they share, 1 VEV and 2 VEV, were both raced under John Ogier's Essex Racing Stable, with assistance from the Aston Martin factory. Both the Zagatos raced in the 1961 24 Hours of Le Mans. However a repeat of the 1959 Le Mans victory was not to be, with both cars retiring. In July 1961 at a British Grand Prix Support race, the Zagato had its first victory with 2 VEV taking the last lap lead from a Jaguar E Type.

2 VEV crashed into a spa in 1962 and was rebuilt to the lightweight DP209 specification. After a car accident in 1993, the car was returned to the 1962 specification.

Chassis 0200 raced in the 1962 24 Hours of Le Mans; however, a blown piston after  hours forced the car to retire.

Sanction II Zagatos 
In 1988, four unutilised chassis numbers were put to use. With the approval of Aston Martin, four DB4 chassis were appropriately uprated to GT specifications. These chassis were then sent to Zagato's Milan workshop to be bodied like the originals, with a smaller oval grille, without the stock DB4 GT's rear tail fins, and with a smoothed out rear end. To familiarise the workforce with construction techniques of the 60s, an original DB4 GT Zagato was sent there to be dismantled. These "Works-Approved Replicas" were known as the "Sanction II" cars. They were outwardly identical, but several changes were effected in the interest of better handling. Each of these cars sold for over $1,000,000. Differences from the "originals" include a larger engine capacity, increased from 3.7 to 4.2 litres, and a smaller wheel diameter, reduced from 16 inches to 15. The first of the four GT-specification rolling chassis was delivered to Zagato in January 1989 and the fourth in April of the same year, with all four being completed in July 1991. All four cars were then given their own chassis numbers, fitting for the 1960s.

Comparison of Sanction I to Sanction II 

Rolls-Royce Phantom in 1961 cost £7,000, in 1988 - $300,000.

Sanction III Zagatos 
The Zagato factory still had two spare body shells left over after producing the Sanction II Zagatos. In 1992, Richard Williams approached the executive chairman of Aston Martin Lagonda Ltd, Walter Hayes, and sought approval for the spare body shells to be used to create two further "Sanction" cars. Walter Hayes gave his approval and the body shells along with two neglected Aston Martin DB4s (chassis No.s DB4/344/R and DB4/424/R) were completed to form a pair of Aston Martin DB4 GT Zagato "Sanction IIIs" in the year 2000.

Replicas 

Due to the huge popularity, very high price tag, great look and rarity of the DB4 GT Zagatos, many replica cars have been constructed based on DB4 and DB4 GT chassis. These replica (or recreation) cars bear a close resemblance to the original Zagatos, but were not made by the Italian Zagato company.

Aston Martin Continuation Series 
In April 2019, Aston Martin Works (the heritage division of Aston Martin) started building a run of 19 DB4 GT Zagatos. The cars can only be purchased as part of the "DBZ Centenary Collection" pack which also includes an Aston Martin DBS GT Zagato. Instead of the original 3.7-litre straight-six, the recreations from Aston Martin Works use a 4.7-litre engine now making around 400 bhp. Aston Martin Works manufactured Continuation Series which captures the essence of Aston Martin's illustrious heritage.

Gallery

Notes

External links 
Aston Martin Heritage – Aston Martin website (Specification and photo)
Fast-Autos – Specification and photos
Supercars.net- Specification and photos
jalopnik.com – Jalopnik Fantasy Garage

DB4
Sports cars
Coupés
Cars introduced in 1960
Cars discontinued in 1963
Rear-wheel-drive vehicles